Vice Admiral Sir Fabian Malbon,  (born 1 October 1946) is a retired Royal Navy officer who served as the Lieutenant Governor of Guernsey from 2005 to 2011.

Naval career
Educated at Brighton Hove and Sussex Grammar School, Malbon joined the Royal Navy in 1965. He was made Commanding Officer of HMS Brave as well as Captain of the 9th Frigate Squadron in 1987 and Director of Naval Service Conditions in 1988. He went on to be Naval Secretary in 1996 and Deputy Commander-in-Chief Fleet in 1999. He retired in 2002.

He was made Lieutenant Governor of Guernsey on 18 October 2005.

Family
Fabian Malbon and his wife Sue have three sons.

References

|-

|-

1946 births
Living people
Guernsey people
People educated at Brighton, Hove and Sussex Grammar School
Royal Navy vice admirals
Knights Commander of the Order of the British Empire
Place of birth missing (living people)